Norman (also Norman Station) is an unincorporated community in northwestern Owen Township, Jackson County, Indiana, United States.  It lies along State Road 58 northwest of the town of Brownstown, the county seat of Jackson County.  Its elevation is 869 feet (265 m), and it is located at  (38.9525511, -86.2749872).  Because the community had two different names, the Board on Geographic Names officially decided in favor of "Norman" in 1943.  Although Norman is unincorporated, it has a post office, with the ZIP code of 47264.

History
Norman was established in 1889, and named for its founder, John A. Norman. The post office, which opened as Norman Station in 1890, was officially renamed Norman in 1935.

References

Unincorporated communities in Jackson County, Indiana
Unincorporated communities in Indiana